It All Goes to Show is a 1969 British short comedy film.

Plot
Councillor Henry Parker, Secretary of Brightsea Bay Entertainments Committee has to seek out talent for the summer show. He bumps into old British Army comrade Mike Sago and the two reignite their double act.

Cast
Arthur Lowe as Councillor Henry Parker
Bill Maynard as Mike Sago
Tim Barrett as Rev. Blunt
Sheila Keith as Councillor Mrs. Parker
Valerie Van Ost as Angela
Norman Pitt as Chairman of Committee

External links

1969 films
1969 comedy films
1969 short films
British comedy short films
1960s English-language films
1960s British films